This is a list of Puerto Rican songwriters. It includes people who were born in Puerto Rico, people who are of Puerto Rican ancestry, and many long-term residents and/or immigrants who have made Puerto Rico their home, and who are recognized for their songwriting work. Entries are in alphabetical order by first name.

Americo Boschetti
Ángel "Cucco" Peña
Antonio Cabán Vale, El Topo
Arturo Somohano
Bobby Capó
Bobby Cruz
Braulio Dueño Colón
Carlos Ponce
Arístides Chavier Arévalo
Daddy Yankee
Dräco Rosa
Ednita Nazario
Edwin Perez (singer)
Eladio Torres
Elvis Crespo
Glenn Monroig
Gloria González
Gustavo Laureano
Herman Santiago
Ignacio Peña
Ivy Queen
Janid
Johnathan Dwayne
José Feliciano
José Miguel Class
José Nogueras
Jose Vazquez-Cofresi
José Vega Santana Remi
Juan Morel Campos
Juan Vélez
Julito Rodríguez
Kany García
Kaydean
Lou Briel
Lourdes Pérez
Luis Fonsi
Miguel Poventud
Myrta Silva
Nano Cabrera
Nino Segarra
Noel Estrada
Obie Bermúdez
Olga Tañón
Pedro Capó
Pedro Flores
Puchi Balseiro
Rafael Hernández
Rafi Escudero
René Pérez
Roy Brown
Silverio Pérez
Sunshine Logroño
Sylvia Rexach
Tite Curet Alonso
Tito Auger
Tommy Torres
Tony Croatto
Vicente Carattini
Wilkins
Yaire
Zayra Alvarez
Zeny & Zory
Zoraida Santiago

References

See also

 Music of Puerto Rico